The Voidz  (formerly Julian Casablancas + The Voidz) are an American rock band. They consist of Julian Casablancas (vocals),  Jeramy "Beardo" Gritter (guitar), Amir Yaghmai (guitar), Jacob "Jake" Bercovici (bass, synthesizers), Alex Carapetis (drums), and Jeff Kite (keyboards). Their debut album was placed 50th in NMEs Top 50 Albums of 2014 list.

History

Formation, Tyranny (2013–2016) 
Jeff Kite, Alex Carapetis and Jake Bercovici had all worked with Casablancas previously. Kite and Carapetis appeared as part of the Sick Six live band (which also featured Danielle Haim), that backed Casablancas when touring his first solo album, Phrazes for the Young. Kite and Carapetis, along with Bercovici, also worked on "I Like the Night", a song Casablancas recorded as part of an advertising campaign he fronted for the French fashion label, Azzaro. Casablancas enjoyed working with the band and chose to collaborate with other musicians, in a similar format to the Sick Six, when recording his next album. Casablancas, Carapetis, Bercovici, and Kite, along with mutual friends Jeramy Gritter and Amir Yaghmai formed The Voidz and began writing music together.

The band, then known as Julian Casablancas + The Voidz, signed to Casablancas' record label, Cult, and following an appearance at SXSW Festival, began touring the world throughout 2014 and 2015, playing a combination of festivals and headline shows, the former of which included the Lollapallooza festivals in Chile, Brazil, and Argentina, as well as Coachella, Festival Estéreo Picnic in Colombia, Governor's Ball in New York and Primavera Sound in Barcelona. The band's debut album, Tyranny, was released on September 23, 2014. The band's live sets generally consist of a mix between Casablancas' earlier solo songs, covers of Strokes songs written solely by Casablancas, Casablancas' collaborations with other artists (such as Daft Punk's "Instant Crush" and Sparklehorse & Danger Mouse's "Little Girl") as well as their own original material from Tyranny and Virtue.

Virtue (2017–2019)  
On December 8, 2017, the band announced Virtue, as well as their signing to RCA. On January 23, 2018, “Leave It In My Dreams,” the first single from their new album Virtue was released. Virtue was announced for release March 30, 2018, on Cult Records via RCA. The band toured extensively and appeared on several late night shows to promote the album.

LP3 (2019–present)  
In 2019, The Voidz collaborated with Mac DeMarco who produced two songs, “Did My Best” and “The Eternal Tao” that were released as a single on Terrible Records. 

On December 15, 2020, the band released a single titled "Alien Crime Lord" in promotion of the Cayo Perico Heist update of Grand Theft Auto Online. On April 1, 2021, the band also released an extended version of their 2019 track "The Eternal Tao", titled "The Eternal Tao 2.0".

Band members
 Julian Casablancas – lead vocals, vocoder, sampler, guitar
 Jeramy "Beardo" Gritter – guitar, keyboards
 Amir Yaghmai – guitar, keyboards
 Jacob "Jake" Bercovici – bass, keyboards
 Alex Carapetis – drums, percussion, bass
 Jeff Kite – keyboards

Discography

Studio albums 
 Tyranny (2014)
 Virtue (2018)

References

External links
 

2013 establishments in the United States
American experimental rock groups
Cult Records artists
Musical groups established in 2013